Omaha Sessions is an album released by 311 that was sold only through their website in October 1998. The album contains re-masterings of highlights from their three independent albums: Dammit!, Hydroponic, and Unity.  The majority of these songs predate S.A. Martinez's full-time membership in the band; as such, he does not appear as frequently as on later albums.

Track listing

Personnel
Nick Hexum - rhythm guitar, vocals
Tim Mahoney - lead guitar
S.A. Martinez - vocals
P-Nut - bass
Chad Sexton - percussion, drums
Jim Watson - guitar on "This Too Shall Pass"

Production
Producer: 
Tracks 1-8 produced by 311 & J.E. Van Horne
Track 9 produced by 311 & Tom Lippold
Mixing and Recording:
Tracks 1-8 by 311 & J.E. Van Horne at Rainbow Recording Studios, Omaha, NE www.rainbowmusicomaha.com
Track 9 by 311 & Tom Lippold at IEV Studios, Omaha, NE
Tracks 1, 2, 3, and 9 re-mixed by Scotch Ralston
Re-Mastering: Joe Gastwirt at Oceanview
Art direction & design: Pawn Shop Press
Photography: Nils Anders Erickson President:Rainbow Recording Studios www.rainbowmusicomaha.com

311 (band) albums
1998 albums